The Ocean Racing Club of Victoria Inc. (ORCV) conducts ocean/offshore and bay yacht races and events in Victoria, Australia.

History
The Ocean Racing Club of Victoria Inc. was formed as the Cruising Yacht Club of Victoria by founding members Bill Wakefield, Fred Cook and Frank Bennell in 1949, so that ocean races in Victorian waters could be efficiently developed and run by an organisation focused exclusively on the needs of ocean racers. It was renamed the Ocean Racing Club of Victoria Inc. in 1972 and incorporated in 1986. The ORCV is an Organising Authority of Category 1, 2 and 3 ocean races and a Yachting Australia Training Centre (YATC) with five Yachting Australia accredited Yachtmaster Offshore and Safety & Sea Survival Course Instructors. 

In 2018, the ORCV introduced the "Four + Autohelm" format to its nautic races.

Description
The Ocean Racing Club of Victoria is a member club of the Australian Sailing (formally Yachting Australia) and the International Sailing Federation (ISAF). Membership is drawn from all of the major keel boat yacht clubs in Victoria, but does not compete with other yacht clubs by operating a clubhouse or marina facility.

All ORCV training activities specifically relate to ocean sailing and racing, particularly where there may be barriers to entering this domain. They are designed to provide supplementary training, which complements other available sailing training from commercial training organisations.

Annual events
The ORCV conduct the following Ocean and Bay yacht races and events:

International events

References

External links
ORCV Website

Yacht clubs in Victoria (Australia)
Sporting clubs in Melbourne
Sports clubs established in 1949
1949 establishments in Australia